Rated PG is a compilation album of songs for film soundtracks by English rock musician Peter Gabriel. The track selection spans over 30 years of music created for the individual films, with "Walk Through the Fire" from 1984 being the earliest and "Everybird" from 2017 being the most recent.

Content 
The album includes many unreleased tracks, some of which are alternate versions of previously released songs. The previously unreleased songs in any form outside of their respective films are "Everybird", "Speak (Bol)", and "Nocturnal".

Release 
Originally only released on limited-edition vinyl on Record Store Day (13 April 2019) through Real World, it eventually became available on digital streaming services later that month to accommodate demand. A digital single, "This is Party Man", was released before the album. It is a new version of the song and features new lyrics from Peter Gabriel. A video for "Everybird" was released on 12 July 2019 featuring footage from the animated film for which it was originally created. In May 2020 it was announced that the album will be made available for general release on vinyl and CD on 12 June 2020.

Critical reception 

Cyrille Delanlssays of Amarok Magazine wrote, "without being essential, Rated PG is an uneven but exciting album in the journey it offers."

Track listing

Omissions 

The following Peter Gabriel songs from film soundtracks were not included in this compilation:

 "Strawberry Fields Forever" from All This and World War II (1976)
 "Out Out" from Gremlins (1984)
 "Lovetown" from Philadelphia (1993)
 "While The Earth Sleeps" (Deep Forest & Peter Gabriel) from Strange Days (1995)
 "Shaking The Tree" from Jungle 2 Jungle (1997)
 "I Grieve" from City of Angels (1998)
 "Animal Nation" from The Wild Thornberrys Movie (2002)

Personnel 

 Peter Gabriel – vocals, production (2–10), arrangement (4)
 Paddy Moloney – vocals (1)
 Black Dyke Mills Band – brass (1)
 Soweto Gospel Choir – vocals (2)
 The Worldbeaters (3)
 Atif Aslam – vocals (8), Urdu vocal arrangement (8)

Technical personnel 
 Bob Ezrin – production (1, 4)
 Thomas Newman – L.A. Sessions production (2)
 Richard Chappell – recording (2), engineering (3, 4, 8, 9), mixing (6)
 Mat Arnold – recording assistance (2)
 Tchad Blake – mixing (2)
 George Acogny – production (3)
 Rod Beale – engineering (3)
 Nick Ingman – orchestration (4)
 Peter Sené – engineering assistance (4)
 David Bottrill – production (5)
 Nile Rodgers – production (7)
 Glenn Tommey – engineering (7)
 Richard Evans – engineering (9), mixing (9)
 Daniel Lanois – production (10), engineering (10)
 Kevin Killen – engineering (10)

Charts

References 

Peter Gabriel albums
Soundtrack compilation albums
2019 albums
Real World Records compilation albums
Real World Records soundtracks
Republic Records compilation albums
Republic Records soundtracks
Virgin EMI Records albums